Imhausen may refer to:

Places 
 Meinerzhagen, a German town in North Rhine-Westphalia with a division named Imhausen
 Windeck, a German town in North Rhine-Westphalia with a division named Imhausen

People 
Annette Imhausen, German historian of ancient Egyptian mathematics

Other 
Imhausen-Chemie, a West German chemical company implicated by Michael R. Gordon in Libyan chemical weapons production
The Imhausen high-pressure process for coal liquefaction